Amelia Ellen Shippy (born October 23, 1944 Denver, Colorado) was the American Ambassador Extraordinary and Plenipotentiary to Malawi (1998-2000).

Shippy was raised in Silver City, New Mexico.  She has a B.S. degree from the University of New Mexico (1966) and a J.D. degree from George Washington University (1977).

References

American women ambassadors
University of New Mexico alumni
George Washington University Law School alumni
People from Denver
People from Silver City, New Mexico
Ambassadors of the United States to Malawi
20th-century American diplomats
1944 births
Living people